Sladun is a village in the municipality of Svilengrad, in Haskovo Province, in southern Bulgaria.

Honours
Sladun Peninsula in Antarctica is named after Sladun.

References

Villages in Haskovo Province